Amastus collaris is a moth of the family Erebidae. It was described by Gottlieb August Wilhelm Herrich-Schäffer in 1853. It is found in Venezuela, Peru, Colombia and Ecuador.

Subspecies
Amastus collaris collaris (Venezuela)
Amastus collaris inconspicuus Strand, 1919 (Colombia)

References

Moths described in 1853
collaris
Moths of South America